The Stowaway (German: Der blinde Passagier) is a 1922 German silent comedy film directed by Victor Janson and starring Ossi Oswalda.

Cast
 Ossi Oswalda
and in alphabetical order
 Willi Allen
 Georg Baselt 
 Henry Bender 
 Wilhelm Diegelmann
 Willy Fritsch 
 Heinrich Gotho 
 Victor Janson
 Hans Junkermann 
 Franz Rauch 
 Robert Scholz 
 Mizzi Schütz

References

Bibliography
 Bock, Hans-Michael & Bergfelder, Tim. The Concise CineGraph. Encyclopedia of German Cinema. Berghahn Books, 2009.

External links

1922 films
Films of the Weimar Republic
German silent feature films
Films directed by Victor Janson
German black-and-white films
UFA GmbH films
1922 comedy films
German comedy films
Silent comedy films
1920s German films